Steaming is a British drama film directed by Joseph Losey, released in 1985, the year after his death. The last film that Losey directed, it was adapted by Nell Dunn and Patricia Losey from Dunn's play of the same name. The film was screened out of competition at the 1985 Cannes Film Festival. The story is about the women who meet regularly in a Turkish bath and decide to fight its closure. The cast was headed by Vanessa Redgrave, Sarah Miles and Diana Dors. It was the last film appearance by Dors, who died in 1984.

The film has no overall plot and is a series of conversations between the women involved. The unifying issue is the announcement that the baths are to be closed to build a leisure centre.

Plot
Three female frequenters of a steam room decide to fight its closure.

Cast
 Vanessa Redgrave as Nancy
 Sarah Miles as Sarah
 Diana Dors as Violet
 Patti Love as Josie
 Brenda Bruce as Mrs. Meadows
 Felicity Dean as Dawn 
 Sally Sagoe as Celia
 Anna Tzelniker as Mrs. Goldstein

References

Further reading
 - Excerpts of this were repeated in: "FILM: LOSEY'S 'STEAMING'" (August 29, 1986)

External links
 

1985 films
1985 drama films
British drama films
1980s English-language films
British films based on plays
Films directed by Joseph Losey
Films shot at Pinewood Studios
Films scored by Richard Harvey
New World Pictures films
1980s British films